Sarah Forbes is a volunteer women's lacrosse assistant coach at the University of Maryland. Originally from the Wembley Lacrosse Club in Perth, Western Australia, Forbes played for the University of Maryland Terrapins, and won three national championships as a player.  She was a three-time All-American, and was named the ACC Female Athlete of the Year in 1997.

In international lacrosse, Forbes represented the Australia women's national lacrosse team at four world championships, including captaining Australia to their second world championship win in 2005, and earning All World team honors in 2005 and 2009 including tournament MVP in 2005.

In 2012 Forbes was elected to the Maryland Terrapins Athletics Hall of Fame. and in 2019, she was inducted into the National Lacrosse Hall of Fame as a truly great player.

References

Australian lacrosse players
Maryland Terrapins women's lacrosse players
Living people
1974 births